UpToDate, Inc. is a company in the Wolters Kluwer Health division of Wolters Kluwer whose main product is UpToDate, a software system that is a point-of-care medical resource.

The UpToDate system is an evidence-based clinical resource. It includes a collection of medical and patient information, access to Lexi-comp drug monographs and drug-to-drug interactions, and a number of medical calculators. UpToDate is written by over 7,100 physician authors, editors, and peer reviewers. It is available both via the Internet and offline on personal computers or mobile devices. It requires a subscription for full access.

The company was launched in 1992 by Dr. Burton Rose along with Dr. Joseph Rush out of Rose's home. They started with nephrology and have since added over twenty other specialties, with more in development.

Controversies
UpToDate's articles are anonymously peer-reviewed and it mandates the disclosure of conflicts of interest by the authors of its articles. In 2014, an article was published in the Journal of Medical Ethics which scrutinised six articles on UpToDate and DynaMed focusing on conditions where the best means of management is contested, or which are treated mostly by branded drugs. The authors found that all six articles examined from UpToDate contained numerous potential conflicts of interest, with contributors having worked as consultants for or received research grants or speaking fees from manufacturers of drugs mentioned in the relevant UpToDate entry.

Access
Full access to the service requires a subscription, which costs US$559 a year as of 2021 for a physician in the United States (lower cost for longer term subscription). Through the Norwegian Electronic Health Library, people in Norway have free access to BMJ Best Practice, UpToDate and drug database Micromedex. UpToDate was made available for free in New Zealand after the 2011 Christchurch earthquake, in Haiti after the 2010 earthquake and in Nepal after the April 2015 earthquake. The Global Health Delivery Project at Harvard University administers access to UpToDate for those who offer medical care to poor or underserved populations outside the United States.
Better Evidence by Ariadne labs provides health professionals from less developed countries full access for free.

See also

BMJ Best Practice
Dynamed
eMedicine

References

External links 
 UpToDate website

Medical websites
Medical and health organisations based in the Netherlands
Health information technology companies